A Family Album is a children's album and fifth studio album by the Verve Pipe. It was released in 2009 on Big Sky Recording.

Track listing
All songs produced by Donny Brown.

Personnel

The Verve Pipe
Band members Brian Vander Ark, Donny Brown and John Connors play throughout. A host of additional musicians contributed to the album.

 Brian Vander Ark – lead vocals, acoustic guitar on tracks 3-6, 8 and 9; classical guitar on "Go to Sleep Now"
 Donny Brown – drums, background vocals, percussion, synthesizer; keyboards on "When One Became Two" and "Only One of You"
 John Connors – bass
 Lou Musa – electric guitar on "Wake Up", "Cereal", "Only One of You" and "Suppertime!"; background vocals on "Wake Up"
 Craig Griffith – harmonica on "Be Part of the Band" and "Suppertime!"; background vocals on "Suppertime!"

Additional Musicians

 Keith Axtell – rhythm guitar and licks on "Only One of You"
 Mark Byerly – trumpet and background vocals on "We Had to Go Home"
 Gary Clavette – clarinet on "We Had to Go Home"; saxophone on "Cereal"
 Ben Keeler – opening electric guitar on "Be Part of the Band"
 Nathanael Koenig – cowbell on "Wake Up"
 Stephanie, Gabrielle & Brooke Krieger, Susan & Elizabeth Rohn – cheerleaders on "Wake Up" and "Be Part of the Band"
 Mark Miller – acoustic guitar on "Wake Up"; electric guitar on "Complimentary Love" and "Worrisome One"
 Motor City Horns (Mark Byerly, trumpet; John Rutherford, trombone; Keith Kaminski, alto and tenor sax) – horns on "Complimentary Love"
 Paul Mundo – trombone on "We Had to Go Home" and "Only One of You"

 Steve Pinckney – electric guitar on "Go to Sleep Now"
 Andy Reed – acoustic and electric guitar on "Be Part of the Band"; ethereal keys and samples on "Go to Sleep Now"
 Kay Rinker-O'Neil – flute on "When One Became Two"; opera voice on "Cereal"
 Emily Rust – "Come and Get It!!" on "Suppertime!"
 Randy Sly – keyboards on "Complimentary Love" and "Be Part of the Band"; organ on "When One Became Two", "Cereal" and "Worrisome One"; piano and electric piano on "Only One of You"
 Tracy Sonneborn – french horn on "Go to Sleep Now"
 Scott VanDell – electric guitar on "We Had to Go Home" and "Be Part of the Band"
 Cathy Waldron – bassoon on "When One Became Two"

Additional production

 Engineered by Geoff Michael, Chris DuRoss and Donny Brown
 Additional Engineering:
 Mark Miller at Harvest Music and Sound
 Andy Reed at Reed Recording Co.
 Mark Byerly at Longview Sound
 Al McAvoy
 Additional Editing by Ryan Wert and Jon Frazer

 Mixed by John Holbrook at The Den, Kinderhook, NY
 Mastered by Glenn Brown at GBP Studios, East Lansing, MI
 Julie Magsig – horn arrangement for "We Had to Go Home" and "Complimentary Love"
 Management: Doug Buttleman at Artist In Mind
 Administration: Mara Wish Buttleman
 Booking: Adam Bauer at Fleming Artists
 Art Direction and Design: Kate Cosgrove

References

The Verve Pipe albums
2009 albums
Children's music albums by American artists
Kindie rock albums